The 2022–23 Arizona Wildcats men's basketball team represented the University of Arizona during the 2022–23 NCAA Division I men's basketball season. The team led by Tommy Lloyd, in his 2nd season as a head coach. This is the Wildcats' 49th season at the on-campus McKale Center in Tucson, Arizona and 44th season as a member of the Pac-12 Conference.

Previous season

Season outlook
Heading into the 2021–22 season, there was a lot of excitement surrounding the program after the hiring of Gonzaga associate head coach Tommy Lloyd.
Arizona came into the season unranked in both the AP Preseason Poll and the USA Today Coaches Poll.

In Lloyd's inaugural season, The Wildcats finished the 2021–22 season at 33–4. During the regular season, Arizona finished with a record of 28–3, 18–2 in conference play to win their 17th regular season title. and 11–0 in non-conference play. Arizona went 17–0 at home, 8–3 on the road, and 2–0 at neutral sites. During the season, Arizona participated in the Roman Main Event in Paradise, Nevada. Arizona defeated Wichita State, and Michigan to finish as champions of the event.

Pac-12 tournament
Arizona entered the Pac-12 tournament as a #1-seed, They faced off against #9-seed Stanford, defeated 84–80 in the quarterfinals. They faced off against #4-seed Colorado, defeated 82–72 in the semifinals. They faced off against #2-seed UCLA defeated 84–76 in the title game to win their 8th conference tournament title in Paradise, Nevada.

NCAA tournament
Arizona entered the NCAA tournament as a #1-seed (South Region), facing off against #16-seed Wright State, Against Wright State, Arizona won 87–70. Furthermore, Arizona's victory against Wright State marked their first win in the NCAA tournament since 2017. In the round of 32, Arizona faced off against #9-seed TCU, Against TCU, Arizona won 85–80 in the overtime thriller. In the sweet sixteen, Arizona faced off against #5-seed Houston losing 60–72, ending their season.

Offseason

Returning players

Departures
Due to COVID-19, the NCAA ruled in October 2020 that the 2020–21 season would not count against the eligibility of any basketball player, thus giving all players the option to return in 2021–22. Additionally, any players who have declared for the 2022 NBA draft—including seniors, who must opt into this year's draft—have the option to return if they make a timely withdrawal from the draft and end any pre-draft relationships with agents. Thus, separate lists will initially be maintained for confirmed and potential departures.

Coaching staff departures

Outgoing Transfers

Acquisitions

Incoming Transfers

2022 recruiting class

2023 recruiting class

2024 recruiting class

Coaching staff additions

2022 NBA draft

Preseason

Preseason rankings
October 26 – Pac-12 Men's Basketball Media Day in San Francisco. Arizona was picked to finish 2nd by the Pac-12 Media Day.
Arizona was ranked 17th in the AP poll. and ranked 13th in the Coaches poll

Source:

Preseason All-conference teams

Source:

Award watch lists
Listed in the order that they were released

Red and Blue game 
The annual Red-Blue game took place at McKale Center on Friday September 30, 2022 at 7:30 p.m. The Red team consisted of Ben Ackerley, Dylan Anderson, Filip Borovicanin, Kylan Boswell, Luke Champion, Luc Krystkowiak, Matthew Lang, Pelle Larsson, Jordan Mains, Courtney Ramey & Azuolas Tubelis.  The Blue team consisted of Adama Bal, Oumar Ballo, Cedric Henderson Jr., Kerr Kriisa, Will Menaugh, Tautvilas Tubelis, Henri Veesaar and Grant Weitman.  The blue team won 49–45 with Oumar Ballo and Henri Veesaar leading all scorers with 16 points each.

Personnel

Roster
Note: Players' year is based on remaining eligibility. The NCAA did not count the 2020–21 season towards eligibility.

 
 

 
 

 
  

 

 On October 31 Courtney Ramey was suspended for three-games by the NCAA as a result of playing in the Portsmouth Invitational.

Source:

Support staff

Schedule
Arizona had previously announced an 8-year agreement with in-state rival NAU through the 2030 season, but was put on hold with Coach Lloyd's son Liam being a member of the NAU team. Instead Arizona will face Nicholls of the Southland conference. The Pac-12 announced a conference educational and scheduling partnership with the SWAC, with six schools holding a two-year home-and-home series and Arizona hosted Southern in the second game of the 2022–23 season. Arizona played in the 2022 Maui Invitational against Cincinnati, Creighton & San Diego State.  They had a return home game with Tennessee, following their match up in Knoxville the previous season. Arizona & Indiana played a neutral site game December 10 at the MGM Grand Garden Arena in Las Vegas, NV. Arizona did not play against Stanford at home and Colorado on the road.

|-
!colspan=12 style=| Exhibition

|-
!colspan=12 style=| Regular season

|-
!colspan=12 style=| Pac-12 Tournament

|-
!colspan=12 style=| NCAA tournament

Source:

Game Summaries
This section will be filled in as the season progresses. 

Source:

Western Oregon (exhibition)

Nicholls

Southern

Utah Tech

Cincinnati

No. 17 San Diego State

No. 10 Creighton

at Utah

California

vs Indiana

Texas A&M–Corpus Christi

Tennessee

Montana State

Morgan State

at Arizona State

Washington

Washington State

at Oregon State

at Oregon

USC

No. 5 UCLA

at Washington State

at Washington

Oregon

Oregon State

at California

at Stanford

Utah

Colorado

Arizona State

at USC

at No. 4 UCLA

Stanford (Pac-12 Quarterfinal)

Arizona State (Pac-12 Semifinal)

No. 2 UCLA (Pac-12 Championship)

Princeton (round of 64)

Statistics
Updated through Mar. 15, 2023

Team total per game

Player Statistics

Season highs

Players 
Points: A. Tubelis, 40 (Oregon)
Field goals: A. Tubelis, 16 (Oregon)
Field Goal Attempts: A. Tubelis, 21 (Oregon)
3 Point Field goals Made: C. Ramey, 8 (Stanford)
3 Point Field goals Attempts: C. Ramey, 16 (Stanford)
Free Throws: A. Tubelis, 10 (Washington State)
Free Throws Attempts: A. Tubelis, 12 (Washington State)
Rebounds: A. Tubelis, 17 (USC)
Assists: K. Kriisa, 12 (Southern)
Steals: A. Tubelis, K. Boswell & P. Larsson, 4 (Montana State, Washington, California & Stanford)
Blocks: O. Ballo, 5 (Southern)
Minutes: K. Kriisa, 39 (Oregon)
Turnovers: K. Kriisa, 6 (Indiana, Arizona State & UCLA)
Fouls: 3 tied, 5 (Southern, San Diego State, USC & UCLA)

Team 
Points: 117, (Nicholls)
Field goals: 38, (Cincinnati & Nicholls)
Field Goal Attempts: 71 (Utah)
3 Point Field goals Made: 15, (Texas A&M-Corpus Christi)
3 Point Field goals Attempts: 35, (Stanford)
Free throws Made: 30, (Nicholls & Southern)
Free throws Attempts: 46, (Southern)
Rebounds: 52, (Texas A&M-Corpus Christi)
Assists: 30, (Nicholls)
Steals: 11, (Montana State)
Blocked Shots: 7, (Washington)
Turnovers: 24, (Nicholls)
Fouls: 22, (Nicholls, Southern, San Diego State & UCLA)

Awards and honors

Midseason awards watchlists

Final awards watchlists

Postseason

National awards

Sources:

Rankings

*AP does not release post-NCAA Tournament rankings

Media coverage

Radio
ESPN Tucson - 1490 AM & 104.09 FM (ESPN Radio) and Nationwide - Dish Network, Sirius XM, Varsity Network and iHeartRadio)
KCUB 1290 AM – Football Radio Show – (Tucson, AZ)
KHYT – 107.5 FM (Tucson, AZ)
KTKT 990 AM – La Hora de Los Gatos (Spanish) – (Tucson, AZ)
KGME 910 AM – (IMG Sports Network) – (Phoenix, AZ)
KTAN 1420 AM – (Sierra Vista, AZ)
KDAP 96.5 FM (Douglas, Arizona)
KWRQ 102.3 FM – (Safford, AZ/Thatcher, AZ)
KIKO 1340 AM – (Globe, AZ)
KVWM 970 AM – (Show Low, AZ/Pinetop-Lakeside, AZ)
XENY 760 – (Nogales, Sonora) (Spanish)
KTZR (1450 AM) - (FoxSports 1450) - (Tucson, AZ)

TV
CBS Family – KOLD (CBS), CBSN 
ABC/ESPN Family – KGUN (ABC), ABC, ESPN, ESPN2, ESPNU, ESPN+, 
FOX Family – KMSB (FOX), FOX/FS1, FSN 
Pac-12 Network (Pac-12 Arizona)
NBC Family – KVOA, NBC Sports, NBCSN
PBS - KUAT
Univision - KUVE (Spanish) 
Telemundo - KHRR (Spanish)

See also

2022–23 Arizona Wildcats women's basketball team

Notes

References

Arizona Wildcats men's basketball seasons
Arizona
Arizona Wildcats men's basketball
Arizona Wildcats men's basketball
Arizona